Amar Singh Rai is an Indian politician. He was elected to the West Bengal Legislative Assembly from Darjeeling in the 2016 West Bengal Legislative Assembly election as a member of the Gorkha Janmukti Morcha.

References

Living people
West Bengal MLAs 2016–2021
Gorkha Janmukti Morcha politicians
Trinamool Congress politicians from West Bengal
People from Darjeeling
Year of birth missing (living people)
Indian Gorkhas
Rai people